Rodney or Rod Williams may refer to:

Rod Williams (American football) (born 1973), offensive/defensive lineman
Rod Williams (Canadian football) (Roderick Williams, born 1987), Canadian football defensive back
Rod Williams (Australian footballer) (born 1948), played 3 matches for South Melbourne in the VFL
Rod Williams (Welsh footballer) (Roderick Williams, 1909–1987), Welsh footballer
Rodney Williams (punter) (born 1977), American and Canadian football punter
Rodney Williams (wide receiver) (born 1973), American football wide receiver
Rodney Williams (basketball) (born 1991), American basketball player
Rodney Williams (governor-general) (born 1947), governor-general of Antigua and Barbuda
 Rod Williams, character in Get Out

See also
Roderick Williams (born 1965), opera singer